The Central Coast Council is a local government area in the Central Coast region of New South Wales, Australia. The area is adjacent to the Pacific Highway, Central Coast Highway and the Northern NSW railway line as well as the Pacific Ocean. The Central Coast has over 40 beaches and over 90km of coastline. The Central Coast Council was established on 12 May 2016 following the amalgamation of Gosford City and Wyong Shire councils.

The most recent Mayor of the Central Coast Council was Lisa Matthews (Labor), who was elected on 23 September 2019. On 30 October 2020, the Minister for Local Government, Shelley Hancock(Liberal), announced the immediate suspension of the elected council and the appointment of former senior public servant Dick Persson as the new interim Administrator. On 13 May 2021, Persson was succeeded as administrator by former acting CEO Rik Hart.

Suburbs and localities 
The local government area includes a moderately densely populated coastal strip that extends northward from the Hawkesbury River and is bounded by the Pacific Motorway to the west, and an extensive sparsely-populated region to the west of the motorway that is largely native bush. The towns and villages located within Central Coast Council are:

Demographics 

At the 2016 census the population of the Central Coast local government area was 327,736.

Council 
The Council comprises fifteen Councillors elected proportionally, with three Councillors elected in five wards. Councillors are elected for a fixed four-year term of office, with the first term to last for three years. The Mayor is elected by Councillors for a period of two years, the Deputy Mayor is elected for one year. On 30 October 2020, the Minister for Local Government, Shelley Hancock announced the suspension of the elected Council and the appointment of Dick Persson as the new interim Administrator of Central Coast Council for an initial period of three months. On 21 January 2021, Hancock announced the extension of Persson's term for an additional three months to 29 April 2021, which was later extended to May 2021. The Council meets fortnightly, with meetings held at the Wyong Civic Centre.

Previous composition
The most recent election was held on 9 September 2017. On 26 October 2020, Councillors Rebecca Gale (Liberal) and Troy Marquart (Liberal) resigned from the council. The makeup of the council, up until the suspension on 30 October 2020 for the term expiring on 4 December 2021, was as follows:

History

Early history
The traditional Aboriginal inhabitants of the lands now known as the Brisbane Water were the Guringai people of the Eora nation. The Darkingung people occupied large areas inland west towards Rylstone, and north to Cessnock and Wollombi.

In 1811, the Governor of New South Wales, Lachlan Macquarie, gave the first land grant in the region to William Nash, a former marine of the First Fleet. No further grants were made in the area until 1821. In 1839 Governor Sir George Gipps named the town of Gosford after his friend, The Earl of Gosford. In 1840, the Brisbane Water Police District was proclaimed covering the area from the Hawkesbury River to Lake Macquarie and which administered local government under the control of magistrates. In 1843, the Brisbane Water District Council was proclaimed on the same boundaries as the Police District, and replaced the appointed magistrates with an elected council as part of an early attempt to establish local government administration throughout the colony. This experiment in local government was not very successful, with much public opposition focused on the issue of increased taxation, and a lack of oversight and faulty administration led to the collapse of many of these District Councils. The Brisbane Water District Council had ceased to exist by 1855, and the NSW Parliament passed the Municipalities Act in 1858, which allowed for the creation of Municipalities and Boroughs if a petition of as few as 50 signatures was presented to the government. However, no petition was ever sent from the residents of Brisbane Water to the government under this act, and local matters reverted to the police magistrates for determination.

Gosford Borough
Under the succeeding Municipalities Act, 1867, which allowed for residents to petition the Colonial Government for incorporation, a petition signed by 59 Gosford residents, amongst a population of approximately 1,000 at the time, was sent to the Governor on 10 June 1886 requesting the establishment of the "Borough of Gosford" with two wards, East Gosford and West Gosford. The petition was subsequently accepted and on 11 November 1886, the "Borough of Gosford" was proclaimed by the Governor Lord Carrington, with an area of 1,840 acres in and around the Town of Gosford. The first election for the six aldermen and two auditors was held at Gosford Courthouse on 1 February 1887, and the first mayor, John Bennett Whiteway, was elected at the first Council meeting on 20 February 1887. From 1888, the Borough Council meetings were held in the Gosford School of Arts building at 38 Mann Street.

Erina Shire
The remaining area of the Brisbane Water Police District outside of Gosford continued to be administered by the police magistrates until 1906. From 7 March 1906, this area became the Erina Shire, when it was proclaimed by the NSW Government Gazette along with 132 other new Shires as a result of the passing of the Local Government (Shires) Act 1905. On 16 May 1906, the Shire was divided in to three Ridings (A, B, C) and five temporary Councillors were appointed (John Bourke of Kincumber, John Martin Moroney of Woy Woy, Harold Stanley Robinson of Penang, Manasseh Ward of Gosford, and Alexander Wilkinson of Wyong). The Temporary Council first met at Gosford Courthouse on 13 June 1906 and Manasseh Ward was elected as the chairman. The first election was held on 24 November 1906 and the first meeting of the elected nine-member Council was held at the Gosford Courthouse on 5 December 1906, with Councillor Ward elected to continue serving as the first Shire President. 

With the coming into effect of the Local Government Act, 1906, the Borough of Gosford became the Municipality of Gosford, as well as the power of Councils to petition the government to dissolve and merge with other Councils. In July 1907 a petition from the Municipality of Gosford was published in the Government Gazette requesting to merge with Erina Shire, the first Council to do so under the 1906 act. However, owing to objections from the Wyong Progress Association and the Erina Shire Council, a public inquiry was established by the Secretary for Public Works, where it was heard that the Gosford Municipality was in debt and desired to merge with Erina to resolve its financial issues. Despite objections, the commissioner returned a recommendation for the merger and a proposal for a six-ward model was considered and accepted at a conference held on 30 September 1907. The proposal for a six-ward Erina Shire with Gosford becoming F Riding was subsequently proclaimed and came into effect on 23 January 1908. The new Shire Council Chambers on Mann Street, Gosford, were officially opened on 4 May 1912.

Woy Woy Shire
However, with the substantial size of Erina Shire covering the entirety of the Central Coast region, some local groups began to organise to separate from the shire and manage their own areas. This occurred in D Riding in particular, where in 1921, a group of ratepayers angered by what they saw as a general neglect of their local area, formed an organisation to work towards the separation of the Woy Woy Peninsula area from Erina Shire. On 27 April 1928 a proposal for separation was received and the Shire of Woy Woy was subsequently proclaimed on 1 August 1928. The first Council meeting was held at the Woy Woy Masonic Hall on 11 August 1928, and land developer and businessman Charles Jefferis Staples was elected as the first Shire President. During his tenure as president moves were made to construct a Council Chambers building in the centre of Woy Woy, which was designed by Clifford H. Finch, built by G. J. Richards, and officially opened on 14 March 1931 at the cost of £1845 (now the Woy Woy Library).

Following severe dysfunction from late 1939 in Woy Woy Shire Council, which was unable to meet or elect a president due to boycotts of councillors over a declining financial position, on 14 February 1940 the Minister for Local Government dismissed Woy Woy Shire Council and appointed Keith William Britton as Administrator. A subsequent investigation by the Administrator found the council's finances "unsound" and subject to an "insidious drift".

Gosford Municipality and Brisbane Water County Council

In March 1936, three Councillors of Erina Shire were dismissed from office for having held office while subject to a special disqualification, and it was also revealed that Council staff had not been paid since February. As the council could not meet due to lack of quorum, on 24 March 1936 the Minister for Local Government, Eric Spooner, dismissed the council and appointed an Administrator, B. C. Hughes. Spooner commissioned Hughes to undertake an inquiry into the administration of Erina Shire and, following a January petition from Gosford and Point Clare residents for a new Gosford municipality, also to investigate the question of the separation of Gosford from the Shire. The inquiry found in favour of a separation of Gosford, which was accepted by Spooner, and Erina Shire was divided again to re-form the Municipality of Gosford on 24 October 1936, including the areas of the former Gosford Municipality abolished in 1908 and also new areas from Narara to Woy Woy and Point Clare. A nine-member provisional council was appointed the same day, and at the first meeting on 24 October 1936 William Calman Grahame was elected as the first Mayor and Charles Staples, the former Mayor of Woy Woy, was elected Deputy Mayor. Following the first Council election on 23 January 1937, Grahame and Staples were re-elected to their positions on 29 January.

In March 1938, the first permanent supply of town water was delivered to Gosford, with the opening of a new water supply direct from Lower Mooney Dam on the Mooney Mooney Creek. On 22 April 1939, the Gosford Council Chambers on Mann Street, designed in the Inter-war Art Deco style by architects Loyal Figgis and Virgil Cizzio and built by A. E. Catterall at a cost of £5,785, was officially opened by the Minister for Local Government, Eric Spooner.

Following significant debate about the provision of electricity undertakings across the Central Coast, including over the split between Erina Shire and Gosford, on 16 October 1942 Gosford Municipality combined with the Shires of Erina and Woy Woy to form the Brisbane Water County Council to provide electricity to the combined area of the three councils. The County Council operated as an electricity and gas supplier and retailer and was managed by representatives of the three councils. The County Council operated until its amalgamation with the Sydney County Council from 1 January 1980.

Gosford and Wyong

In June 1945, Erina Shire resolved to investigate the reconstitution of local government on the Central Coast into two shires and following further discussions a formal proposal was presented to the Minister for Local Government, Joseph Cahill, in October 1945. Nevertheless, the proposal proved divisive, with Gosford and the Wyong section of Erina Shire in favour and the rest of Erina Shire and Woy Woy Shire opposed. The formal government inquiry subsequently supported the proposal and in April 1946, Cahill notified the councils of his intention to proceed. In response, Woy Woy Shire held a plebiscite in July 1946 on the question which on a low turnout resolved to opposed amalgamation, a vote that Cahill considered a waste of public money considering the decision was already made. On 1 January 1947, part of Erina Shire, all of Woy Woy Shire and the Municipality of Gosford formed Gosford Shire, and the remainder of Erina Shire north and east of Kulnura, Central Mangrove and Lisarow formed Wyong Shire.

Following the changes, the new Wyong Shire Council initially rented the old Erina Shire offices in Gosford, but soon acquired some army huts from Cowra and had them moved to Wyong to serve as temporary Council Chambers, which were officially opened by Minister Joseph Cahill on 4 February 1948. These chambers were later replaced by a more substantial Council Administration Building at 2 Hely Street Wyong completed in 1959.

In August 1948, Gosford Shire established the first Library Service, with branches opening on 13 August at Woy Woy (in the old Council Chambers) and on 16 August on Mann Street next to the Council Chambers. An expanded Gosford Branch Library was opened in 1951 by the Minister for Education, Bob Heffron. New Libraries were subsequently opened at Gosford (Donnison St, 1969), Umina (1983), Kariong (2002) and at Kincumber, Wyoming and Erina (2003). Wyong Shire took longer to deliver its own Library Service by 1959, having delayed a proposal on cost grounds in 1951, and held a referendum on the question in December 1953 which was resolved in favour of adopting the Library Act, 1939. Wyong Shire Council formally adopted the act in 1958 and opened the first public library service on the ground floor of the Council Chambers in May 1959. The Wyong Library Service eventually expanded to five branches at Toukley, The Entrance, Tuggerah (1995), Lake Haven (2002), and Bay Village.

In 1974–1976, the 1939 Gosford Council Council Chambers were demolished and replaced by the Gosford Administration Building, a Brutalist style tower with a pre-cast concrete facade designed by prominent architects, McConnell Smith & Johnston. On 9 November 1979, the Shire of Gosford was proclaimed as the City of Gosford, with effect from 1 January 1980.

Establishment of Central Coast Council
This proposal was supported by Wyong Shire and Gosford City councils, who had submitted the proposal to merge as part of the NSW Government's Fit for the Future reform process.

On 12 May 2016, with the release of the Local Government (Council Amalgamations) Proclamation 2016, the Central Coast Council was formed from Wyong Shire and Gosford City councils. The first meeting of the Central Coast Council was held at the Wyong Civic Centre on 25 May 2016, with meetings alternating between Gosford and Wyong. From amalgamation on 12 May 2016 to September 2017, the Central Coast Council area was administered by the former General Manager of Blacktown City Council (2000–2005), Ian Reynolds, with former Wyong Shire Acting General Manager Rob Noble appointed as Interim General Manager and Gosford City General Manager Paul Anderson appointed Deputy General Manager.

The first election for the new 15-member Council across five wards was held on 8 September 2017, with 6 Labor, 5 Independent and 4 Liberal councillors elected.

Administration
On 30 October 2020, the Minister for Local Government, Shelley Hancock announced the suspension of the elected Council and the appointment of Dick Persson as the new interim Administrator of Central Coast Council for an initial period of three months. This occurred following the reveal of an $89 million debt in Council finances and an emergency $6.2 million loan provided by the NSW Government in order for Council to pay its own staff. Persson's appointment was announced with the task of ensuring "greater oversight and control over the council’s budget and expenditure to restore its financial sustainability and importantly reinstill the community’s trust in the effective functioning of their council." Persson, a former administrator of Northern Beaches Council, Warringah Council, and Port Macquarie-Hastings Council, was also appointed with Rik Hart on the administration operations team, with whom he had worked on the transformation at Warringah Council in 2007–2008. On 26 October 2020, following Hancock's notice of her intention to suspend the council on 21 October, Councillors Rebecca Gale (Gosford East; Liberal) and Troy Marquart (Gosford West; Liberal) resigned from the council.

On 3 November 2020, Persson announced that the Council CEO, Gary Murphy, would continue on extended leave, and Rik Hart was appointed as Acting CEO. Rik Hart is a former Chief Executive of Hutt City Council (2001–2006) and General Manager of Warringah Council (2007–2016) and Inner West Council (2016–2019). In Mar–Sep 2019 he was Acting CEO of the City of Parramatta Council following the early termination of the previous CEO. On 30 November 2020, Persson announced that he had terminated Murphy's employment as CEO, effective immediately.

On 2 December 2020, Persson delivered his first 30-day interim report which revealed "catastrophic budget mismanagement", including accumulated losses of $232 million since 2016, increased debt from $317 million (2016) to $565 million (2020), and an estimated operating loss of $115 million for 2020/2021 financial year. Persson found that while no evidence of corruption could be found, poor financial decisions by senior management including the CEO and Chief Financial Officer, including the use of restricted reserve funds for capital works, contributed to the poor financial position of the council, and that the elected council failed to hold management to account: "This is a story about the failure of a council to understand or practise the basics of sound financial management." Persson noted that several actions were required to put the council in a stronger position including asset sales of at least $40 million, an increase in rates and council charges, and a substantial reduction in Council staff to 2016 amalgamation levels including a significant reduction in upper and middle management positions. While acknowledging that most staff were "working hard to deliver services to their community [and] what has occurred is not their fault", Persson also noted the hardship and impact that "previous financial mismanagement will have on all residents and ratepayers of the Central Coast", "they don't expect to see things go from what seemed to be okay to what I'm calling the greatest financial calamity in the history of local government in New South Wales". On 14 December 2020 Persson formally adopted the first region-wide Central Coast Local Environmental Plan (CCLEP) and Development Control Plan (CCDCP), consolidating the Gosford and Wyong plans.

On 21 January 2021, the Minister for Local Government announced the extension of Persson's term for an additional three months to 29 April 2021, noting: "There is no doubt that [Persson] needs more time to develop and implement his recovery strategy to restore stability and address the significant reputational, financial and organisational issues. In particular, Mr Persson is focusing on recruiting a new general manager and putting a new budget in place for next financial year. Mr Persson and acting general manager Rik Hart have done an outstanding job to date and I thank them for their efforts in these very challenging circumstances." On 2 February, Persson delivered his 3-month progress report announcing a number of further changes, including that Rik Hart be appointed as Financial Controller once the new CEO takes office, the securing of new loans of $150 million and a referendum to reduce the number of councillors.

On 2 March 2021, Persson announced the appointment of David Farmer as the next council CEO, commencing his term on 12 April 2021. Farmer has served as the CEO of Ipswich City Council (2019–2021), General Manager of Wollongong City Council (2007–2019), CEO of Cairns City Council (2000–2007), and General Manager of Mudgee Shire Council (1996–2000). The following day on 3 March, Persson also announced that he had approved a referendum to be held at the next local government elections, scheduled for September 2021, to request the reduction of the number of councillors from 15 to 9, with the option of a no-ward or three-ward models.

On 15 April, Persson sent his final report to Minister Hancock expressing his view that "by far the greatest reason CCC became insolvent was due to mismanagement of their budget over the years following the merger and leading up to their suspension" and recommending that the Local Government Minister, "take whatever action necessary to prevent the return of the currently suspended councillors, and to delay the September 2021 election to allow a formal Inquiry to determine what is needed to achieve the successful merger of the two previous Councils." Persson's recommendations were subsequently supported by Shelley Hancock, who on 26 April 2021 announced the convening of a public inquiry headed by Roslyn McCulloch, a partner of Pikes & Verekers and former commissioner in the 2019 public inquiry into Balranald Shire, as the commissioner. Hancock announced that, as a result, the council would remain suspended, the elections scheduled for September 2021 would be postponed to September 2022, and Persson's term as administrator would be extended for a further two weeks to May 2021. Former acting CEO Rik Hart was also announced as the next administrator following Persson's decision to step down, and he took up office as the new administrator on 13 May 2021.

See also

 Local government areas of New South Wales

References

External links
Central Coast Council

 

 
Local government areas of New South Wales
Central Coast (New South Wales)
2016 establishments in Australia